Shireen Ahmed is a writer, public speaker, and award-winning sports activist focusing on Muslim women in sports, as well as the intersections of racism and misogyny in sports.

Work 
Ahmed is well-known in the women in sports industry, a frequent commentator around intersectionality and freedom of identity practice within sports. In an interview with The McGill Daily, Ahmed explained what being a sports activist was:

Ahmed actively engages with media producers in mainstream and alternative groups. In one example, Ahmed responded to a documentary film about a women's soccer team in Zanzibar. In an interview with researchers for the study, "Radical Sports Journalism?: Reflections on 'Alternative' Approaches to Covering Sport-Related Social Issues," Ahmed explained, "The title of the movie was 'From Veils to Cleats.' I emailed them through Facebook. I didn't call them out. Basically, I said, when you use that title you're saying you can be either veiled or unveiled – that's it…If those women decide to take off their veils while they're playing that's their choice as long as they have a safe space to do it, but a lot of the women on that team don't unveil while they play so what are you actually saying here? So, they changed the title of their movie, which I felt was huge."

She is part of the weekly podcast, Burn It All Down, the first feminist sports podcast to analyze sports culture from an intersectional feminist lens. Her co-hosts are Hofstra University History Professor Brenda Elsey, author and sportswriter Jessica Luther, Lindsay Gibbs of ThinkProgress, and Penn State University Professor of History and Women's Gender, and Sexuality Studies Amira Rose Davis. They have interviewed guests like ESPN's Jemele Hill, legendary sportscaster Andrea Kremer, WNBA's Layshia Clarendon and Essence Carson, and Brazilian soccer legends Sissi and Tafa.

Personal life 
Ahmed was born to Pakistani parents in Halifax, Canada. She attended the University of Toronto in Canada, and played soccer during college. Ahmed now lives in Toronto, Canada with her family.

Honors and awards 
Ahmed received the 2018 Naiem Malik Memorial Award for her advocacy work around Muslim women in sports. She was also named to the Muslim Women in Sports Powerlist in 2018 and 2019.

References

External links 
David Zirin, From the NBA Finals to the Women’s World Cup, The Nation, 
 Voices of the Game: Shireen Ahmed is a powerful advocate for women of color in sports, Raw Charge, July 30, 2018
Personal Website

Year of birth missing (living people)
Living people
Canadian women journalists
Canadian sportswomen
Canadian women podcasters
Canadian podcasters
Canadian women activists
Canadian people of Pakistani descent